The Men's 50 Freestyle at the 10th FINA World Swimming Championships (25m) was swum 16–17 December 2010 in Dubai, United Arab Emirates. Preliminary heats and semifinals of the event were on 16 December; the final on 17 December.

At the start of the event, the existing World (WR) and Championship records (CR) were as follows.

The following records were established during the competition:

Results

Preliminary heats

* Kishida scratched the semifinals, so Dotto (17th) advanced to the semifinals in his place.

Semifinals

Swim-off

Final

References

Freestyle 0050 metre, men's
World Short Course Swimming Championships